Pseudocraterellus is a genus of fungi in the family Cantharellaceae.

References

External links

Cantharellaceae
Taxa named by E. J. H. Corner
Taxa described in 1958